The Karen New Year, also known as the Kayin New Year, is one of the major holidays celebrated by the Karen people. The Karen New Year falls on the first day of Pyatho, the tenth month in the Burmese calendar, and typically falls in December or January. The timing coincides with the completion of the Southeast Asian rice harvest in the lead-up to Pyatho. Celebrations typically include don dances and bamboo dances, singing, speeches, and the consumption of food and alcohol. The day is a gazetted public holiday in Myanmar.

History
The Karen New Year was established in 1937 or 1938. The holiday was recognized by the British colonial administration as a public holiday in 1938. In 2017, the two Karen major liberation groups, leaders from the Karen National Liberation Army and the Karen National Union, jointly celebrated the Karen New Year for the first time since 1967 in Kayin State's Hlaingbwe Township.

See also
Karen people
Public holidays in Kawthoolei
Public holidays in Myanmar

References

Public holidays in Myanmar
Karen people
Observances set by the Burmese calendar